Lee Kang-chul (Hangul: 이강철; born May 24, 1966, in Gwangju, South Korea) is a South Korean former professional baseball pitcher and current manager of the KT Wiz. A submarine-style pitcher, he played 16 seasons in the KBO League, mostly for the Haitai/Kia Tigers. He is second all-time in the KBO League in career strikeouts and third in career victories. Lee was one of the top KBO pitchers of the 1990s, and is the only pitcher from that league to have won 10+ games in ten consecutive seasons, which he did from 1989 to 1998.

Playing career 
Born in Gwangju, Lee attended Gwangju Jeil High School and Dongguk University. He pitched for the South Korea national baseball team in the 1988 Baseball World Cup and also in the 1988 Summer Olympics.

Lee debuted with the Haitai Tigers in 1989 at age 23 and had an immediate impact, going 15-8 with a 3.23 earned run average as the Tigers won the Korean Series. (During his career, Lee would win four more KBO championships with the Tigers.) 

Lee went 18-9 in 1992, with 155 strikeouts, enough to lead the KBO that year.

He was the Most Valuable Player of the 1996 Korean Series, which the Tigers won 4-games-to-2 over the Hyundai Unicorns. During the Series, Lee had two wins, a save, and a 0.56 ERA.

Lee sat out the 1999 season and returned to the KBO in 2000 with the Samsung Lions. He didn't pitch well for them, and mid-season 2001 was traded back to the Tigers franchise (now known as the Kia Tigers). In his second stint with the Tigers he was primarily a relief pitcher. 

During the 2004 season, Lee broke Sun Dong-yol's career KBO strikeout record of 1,698, but Lee's total was surpassed later that season by current KBO career strikeout king Song Jin-woo.

Lee retired in 2005. His 1,749 career strikeouts are second all-time in the KBO League, and his 152 victories are third on the all-time list.

Coaching/managing career 
Lee began coaching the season after he retired, serving as the Tigers' pitching coach from 2006 to 2012. He was "head coach" of the Nexen Heroes for four seasons, from 2013 to 2016. Lee coached for the South Korea national baseball team that won the Silver Medal in the 2017 Asia Professional Baseball Championship. Lee then moved to the Doosan Bears, serving as the team's KBO Futures League manager in 2017 and the KBO team's pitching coach in the 2018 season.

He has been the manager of the KT Wiz since the end of the 2018 season. Lee led the young club to its first .500 record in his first year as manager.

See also 
 List of KBO career strikeout leaders
 List of KBO career win leaders

References

External links 

 Career statistics and player information from MyKBOStats.com

1966 births
Living people
Sportspeople from Gwangju
South Korean baseball players
Kia Tigers players
Samsung Lions players
KBO League pitchers
Baseball players at the 1988 Summer Olympics
Olympic baseball players of South Korea
Dongguk University alumni
South Korean baseball managers
South Korean baseball coaches
KT Wiz managers